Copper Falls mine was a set of numerous copper mine shafts and adits south of Eagle Harbor, Michigan.  The mine was established in 1846.  The mine is in Eagle Harbor Township, near the community of Copper Falls and the water fall on the Owl Creek with the same name.

References

External links
 Copper falls map at Copper Country Explorer

Copper mines in Michigan
Buildings and structures in Keweenaw County, Michigan
1846 establishments in Michigan